Hoe-farming  is a term introduced (as ; as opposed to Ackerbau) by Eduard Hahn in 1910
to collectively refer to primitive forms of agriculture, defined by the absence of the plough. Tillage in hoe-farming cultures is done by simple manual tools such as 
digging sticks or hoes.
Hoe-farming is the earliest form of agriculture practiced in the Neolithic Revolution.
Early forms of the plough (ard) were introduced throughout the Near East  (Naqada II) and Europe  (Linear Pottery culture) by the 5th to 4th millennium BC. 
The invention spread throughout Greater Persia and parts of Central Asia, reaching East Asia in the 2nd millennium BC (Chinese Bronze Age).

The parts of the world where  agriculture was introduced but not the plough  (in the case of the New World up to the introduction of plough-farming with European colonization) were named the hoe-cultivation belt by Hahn (1914), followed by Werth (1954). 
The Hoe-cultivation belt is mostly located in tropical latitudes, including  Sub-Saharan Africa (but not the Horn of Africa, where the plough appears to have been introduced 
via Egypt), Maritime Southeast Asia, and the pre-Columbian Americas.

Hoe-farming often coincides with long fallow systems and shifting cultivation. Split hoes (also known as prong hoes, tined hoes or bent forks) are hoes that have two or more tines at right angles to the shaft. Their use is typically to loosen the soil, prior to planting or sowing. It provides the ability to cultivate effectively at small row distances. Split hoeing is contrasted to permanent plough-based cultivation systems and the intensification of agriculture. Hoe-farming may contain slash and burn clearance techniques, but they are not strictly necessary. It is usually embedded in the logic of subsistence agriculture.

See also 
 Slash and burn
 Subsistence agriculture
 Center of origin

References 

 Eduard Hahn Niederer Ackerbau oder Hackbau? Globus 97, 1910, S. 202–204.
 Eduard Hahn Von der Hacke zum Pflug. Quelle & Meyer, Leipzig, 1914.
 Eduard Hahn Die Haustiere und ihre Beziehungen zur Wirtschaft des Menschen (Leipzig, 1896).
 Eduard Hahn: "Ackerbau". In: Reallexikon der Germanischen Altertumskunde (ed. Johannes Hoops, Straßburg 1911–1919), vol. 1, 17.
 Eduard Hahn: "Hackbau". In: Reallexikon der Vorgeschichte (ed. Max Ebert, Berlin, 1924–1932) vol. 5, 12-13.
 Emil Werth: Grabstock, Hacke und Pflug. Ludwigsburg, 1954.
   "

History of agriculture
Prehistoric agriculture
Neolithic
Agricultural revolutions
Tropical agriculture